This was the first edition of the tournament. Shuko Aoyama and Ena Shibahara won the title, defeating Hayley Carter and Luisa Stefani in the final, 7–6(7–5), 6–4.

Seeds

Draw

Finals

Top half

Bottom half

References
Main Draw

Abu Dhabi Women's Tennis Open - Doubles